The seventh season of Australian Idol began on 9 August 2009, to determine who would succeed season 6 winner, Wes Carr. Beginning amid controversy, judge Kyle Sandilands was replaced by Sony Music record executive, Jay Dee Springbett. It was the only season where all four final contestants were eighteen years old or younger. Stan Walker was declared the winner on 22 November 2009.

Overview

Format changes
Ian Dickson, and Marcia Hines returned as judges; however, long-term judge Kyle Sandilands was sacked after causing controversy on his radio show prior to the premiere, although he was still present for the auditions as they had been pre-recorded some weeks earlier. On 23 August 2009, it was announced on the Idol show that the new judge taking over Kyle Sandilands' spot would be Jay Dee Springbett. Andrew G returned as host, with assistance from Ricki-Lee Coulter due to the departure of James Mathison. The first auditions saw guest judge Brian McFadden join the panel, and his fiancée Delta Goodrem acted as a guest judge for the Sydney auditions.

A further change was also decided for the Top 12 round eliminations. The Monday-night elimination show was axed in favour of a two-hour 'super Sunday' elimination/ performance show, in which a contestant was eliminated according to votes tallied the previous week, followed by performances.

Ratings
The first episode, which featured auditions in both Melbourne and Brisbane, achieved an audience of 1.3m. This was considerably lower than previous first episodes. In 2006, the premiere garnered 1.4m, the 2007 reached 1.65m and 2008 achieved 1.4m. The peak audience, however, of 1.77m was the biggest-seen in years. The show won the night in the 18–49 demographic.

Auditions
The auditions were held at the following locations:

^ Auditioning contestants were required to be between the ages 16 and 30 on 30 June 2009 (born between 1 July 1979 and 1 July 1993).

Semi-finals
These aired on the week of 24 to 27 August, allowing viewers to vote. The "Wildcard" Performance Show followed on Sunday, 30 August, with live results revealed the following week, on 6 September.

Group 1

 Hayley Warner – "Cryin' Shame"  (Diesel)
 Seth Drury – "You Found Me"  (The Fray)
 Jamila Ioane – "For Once in My Life"  (Stevie Wonder)

 Toby Moulton – "Yellow"  (Coldplay)
 Kate Cook – "Your Mama Don't Dance"  (Loggins and Messina)
 Stan Walker – "If I Ain't Got You"  (Alicia Keys)

Advancing to the Top 12: Stan Walker & Kate Cook
Wild Card Contenders: Hayley Warner & Toby Moulton

Group 2

 Ashleigh Toole – "Hurt"  (Christina Aguilera)
 Adam Eckersley – "All Fired Up"  (Pat Benatar)
 Marijana Topalovic – "It Must Have Been Love"  (Roxette)

 Lauren Street – "You Oughta Know"  (Alanis Morissette)
 Casey Barnes – "Her Diamonds"  (Rob Thomas)
 Nathan Brake – "Don't Let the Sun Go Down on Me"  (Elton John)

Advancing to the Top 12: Ashleigh Toole & Nathan Brake
Wild Card Contenders: Lauren Street & Casey Barnes

Group 3

 Daniel Raso – "You to Me Are Everything"  (The Real Thing)
 Aliqua Mao – "I Will Always Love You"  (Whitney Houston)
 Nicole Banks – "Viva la Vida"  (Coldplay)

 Jason Bartlett – "Tears in Heaven"  (Eric Clapton)
 Scott Newnham – "Run It!"  (Chris Brown)
 Sabrina Batshon – "Hush Hush"  (Pussycat Dolls)

Advancing to the Top 12: Sabrina Batshon & Scott Newnham
Wild Card Contender: Aliqua Mao

Group 4

 Kim Cooper – "Waking Up in Vegas"  (Katy Perry)
 Ed Zaidan – "Foreign Land"  (Eskimo Joe)
 Lucie Johnson – "Sweet Dreams"  (Beyoncé Knowles)

 Tim Johnston – "Signed, Sealed, Delivered (I'm Yours)"  (Stevie Wonder)
 Tenielle Muslin – "Love Story"  (Taylor Swift)
 James Johnston – "Crazy"  (Gnarls Barkley)

Advancing to the Top 12: James Johnston & Kim Cooper
Wild Card Contenders: Ed Zaidan, Lucie Johnson, Tim Johnston & Tenielle Muslin

Wildcard

 Lucie Johnson – "Boogie Wonderland" (Earth, Wind and Fire)
 Casey Barnes – "Never Say Never (Don't Let Me Go)" (The Fray)
 Aliqua Mao – "The Power of Love" (Celine Dion)
 Lauren Street – "Low" (Kelly Clarkson)
 Tim Johnston – "Yesterday" (The Beatles)

 Ed Zaidan – "White Noise" (The Living End)
 Tenielle Muslin – "Kiss Me" (Sixpence None the Richer)
 Toby Moulton – "With or Without You" (U2)
 Hayley Warner – "I Do Not Hook Up" (Kelly Clarkson)

Advancing to the Top 12 through the Public vote: Toby Moulton and Hayley Warner
Advancing to the Top 12 through the Judges picks: Casey Barnes and Tim Johnston

Weekly Song Themes

Group/Guest Performances

The Top 12 Finalists

Stan Walker

Stan Walker was born in October 1990. Although residing in Australia for the past three and a half years, Stan grew up in Hamilton and Tauranga, New Zealand. He works in retail. He has the Māori word ataahua (meaning "beautiful") tattooed on his neck.

Audition: "Ordinary People" (John Legend)
Theatre Week (Round 1): "Jesus Loves Me"
Theatre Week (Round 2): "Use Somebody" (Kings of Leon)
Theatre Week (Round 3): "Let's Stay Together" (Al Green)
Top 24: "If I Ain't Got You" (Alicia Keys)
Top 12: "Umbrella" (Rihanna)
Top 11: "Nothing Else Matters" (Metallica)
Top 10: "Straight Lines" (Silverchair)
Top 9: "Purple Rain" (Prince and The Revolution)
Top 8: "Dear Mr. President" (P!nk)
Top 7: "Single Ladies (Put a Ring on It)" (Beyoncé)
Top 6: "Circle of Life" (Elton John)
Top 6: "We Will Rock You" (Queen)
Top 5: "Hallelujah" (Leonard Cohen)
Top 5: "Ain't No Mountain High Enough" (Marvin Gaye and Tammi Terrell)
Top 4: "The Climb" (Miley Cyrus)
Top 4: "Let Me Love You" (Mario)
Top 3: "Amazing Grace (My Chains Are Gone)" (Chris Tomlin)
Top 3: "It's a Man's Man's Man's World" (James Brown)
Top 3: "Eye of the Tiger"  (Survivor)
Top 2: "How Can You Mend a Broken Heart" (Bee Gees)
Top 2: "Superstar" (Luther Vandross)
Top 2: "Sweet Dreams" (Beyoncé)
Top 2: "Black Box" (Winner's Single) – Winner

Hayley Warner

Hayley Warner was born on 23 January 1992 in Sydney. She was the lead singer of her band, Bleached Academy and worked in retail at a surf shop. She was also related to a young and upcoming New South Wales cricket player David Warner.

Audition: "Daughters" (John Mayer)
Theatre Week (Round 1): N/A
Theatre Week (Round 2): "Human" (The Killers)
Theatre Week (Round 3): "Sober" (P!nk)
Top 24: "Cryin' Shame" (Diesel)
Wildcard: "I Do Not Hook Up" (Kelly Clarkson)
Top 12: "Light Surrounding You" (Evermore)
Top 11: "Misery Business" (Paramore)
Top 10: "Leave (Get Out)" (JoJo)
Top 9: "Dancing in the Dark" (Bruce Springsteen)
Top 8: "Funhouse" (Pink)
Top 7: "Tainted Love" (Gloria Jones)
Top 6: "These Days" (Powderfinger)
Top 6: "December, 1963 (Oh, What a Night)" (Frankie Valli)
Top 5: "Somebody Told Me" (The Killers)
Top 5: "Stone Cold Sober" (Paloma Faith)
Top 4: "I Don't Care" (Fall Out Boy)
Top 4: "Heavy Cross" (Gossip)
Top 3: "Bitter Sweet Symphony" (The Verve)
Top 3: "New Sensation" (INXS)
Top 3: "One" (U2)
Top 2: "For Once in My Life" (Stevie Wonder)
Top 2: "UFO" (Sneaky Sound System)
Top 2: "Don't Stop the Music" (Rihanna)
Top 2: "Good Day" (Winner's Single) – Runner up

James Johnston

James Johnston was born on 26 November 1990 in Wingham, New South Wales. He was a part of Starstruck in 2005, performing in front of thousands. He prefers the acoustic/rock style of music.

Audition: "Your Body Is a Wonderland" by John Mayer
Theatre Week (Round 1): "You'll Never Walk Alone" from the show Carousel
Theatre Week (Round 2): N/A
Theatre Week (Round 3): "No Such Thing" John Mayer
Top 24: "Crazy" Gnarls Barkley
Top 12: "How to Save a Life" The Fray
Top 11: "Thnks Fr Th Mmrs" Fall Out Boy
Top 10: "Drops of Jupiter (Tell Me)" Train
Top 9: "The Power of Love" Huey Lewis and the News
Top 8: "Who Knew" P!nk
Top 7: "Fever" Peggy Lee
Top 6: "Crazy Little Thing Called Love" Queen
Top 6: "You'll Never Walk Alone" (from the show Carousel)
Top 5: "Mercy" (Duffy)
Top 5: "Use Somebody" (Kings of Leon)
Top 4: "Daughters" By John Mayer
Top 4: "This Is How a Heart Breaks" (Rob Thomas)
Top 3: "More Than Words" (Extreme)
Top 3: "Hold the Line" (Toto)
Top 3: "Learn to Fly" (Foo Fighters) – Eliminated on 15 November

Nathan Brake
Nathan Brake was born on 27 July 1991 in Guildford, Sydney. He was a student at the Australian International Performing Arts High School. He is the lead singer of his band, Ackolade. Nathan has since performed at a number of events including the 2009 Melbourne Christmas carols with Ricki Lee Coulter.

Nathan Brake has an unofficial fan site Nathan Nation where upcoming events are mentioned and contains a forum for fans.

Audition: "Bohemian Rhapsody" (Queen)
Theatre Week (Round 1): "Papa Was a Rollin' Stone" (The Temptations)
Theatre Week (Round 2): "To the Moon and Back"(Savage Garden)
Theatre Week (Round 3): "We Are the Champions" (Queen)
Top 24: "Don't Let the Sun Go Down on Me" (Elton John)
Top 12: "Stop and Stare" (OneRepublic)
Top 11: "Second Chance" (Shinedown)
Top 10: "Since U Been Gone" (Kelly Clarkson)
Top 9: "Livin' on a Prayer" (Bon Jovi)
Top 8: "Just Like a Pill" (P!nk)
Top 7: "It Don't Mean a Thing (If It Ain't Got That Swing)" (Duke Ellington)
Top 6: "Thriller" (Michael Jackson)
Top 6: "The Music of the Night" (from the show The Phantom of the Opera)
Top 5: "Makes Me Wonder" (Maroon 5)
Top 5: "Mad World" (Michael Andrews and Gary Jules)
Top 4: "Red" (Daniel Merriweather)
Top 4: "Closer" (Ne-Yo) – Eliminated on 8 November

Toby Moulton
Toby Moulton was born in 1979 and worked as a primary school teacher, born in Melrose, South Australia. He teaches at St Joseph’s School Tranmere, South Australia.

Audition: "Exit Music" by Radiohead
Theatre Week (Round 1): N/A
Theatre Week (Round 2): N/A
Theatre Week (Round 3): "Open Your Eyes" by Snow Patrol
Top 24: "Yellow" by Coldplay
Wildcard: "With or Without You" by U2
Top 12: "Creep" by Radiohead
Top 11: "Starlight" by Muse
Top 10: "Take On Me" by a-ha
Top 9: "I Want to Know What Love Is" by Foreigner
Top 8: "Please Don't Leave Me" by P!nk
Top 7: "My Way" by Frank Sinatra
Top 6: "Exit Music" by Radiohead
Top 6: "Somebody to Love" by Queen
Top 5: "Don't Look Back in Anger" by Oasis
Top 5: "Politik" by Coldplay – Withdrew on November, 1

Kate Cook
Kate Cook was born in 1983 and came from Lowood, Queensland. She worked as a meat cutter at an abattoir. Her mother, who was her biggest musical influence, committed suicide when Kate was 16. Cook wrote her first single release about her mother, "Make You Stay" (released independently and available to Australian radio in April 2010). She died on 3 March 2019.

Audition: "Make You Stay" (own composition)
Theatre Week (Round 1): N/A
Theatre Week (Round 2): N/A
Theatre Week (Round 3): "Hard Workin' Man" by Brooks & Dunn
Top 24: "Your Mama Don't Dance" by Loggins and Messina
Top 12: "Stuck in the Middle" by Stealers Wheel
Top 11: "Are You Gonna Be My Girl" by Jet
Top 10: "Landslide" by Fleetwood Mac
Top 9: "When the Going Gets Tough, the Tough Get Going" by Billy Ocean
Top 8: "Trouble" by P!nk
Top 7: "Hit the Road Jack" by Ray Charles
Top 6: "Make You Feel My Love" by Garth Brooks
Top 6: "Son of a Preacher Man" by Dusty Springfield – Eliminated on 25 October

Kim Cooper
Kim Cooper was born on 29 November 1987 in Melbourne. At age 17, she moved to Townsville, Queensland, after her father was diagnosed with Bipolar disorder. She works in fashion retail.

Audition: "Like It Loud" by Cassie Davis
Theatre Week (Round 1): "Sorry" by Maria Mena
Theatre Week (Round 2): "Sex on Fire" by Kings of Leon
Theatre Week (Round 3): "Before He Cheats" by Carrie Underwood
Top 24: "Waking Up in Vegas" by Katy Perry
Top 12: "Best of You" by Foo Fighters
Top 11: "I Want You To Want Me" by Cheap Trick
Top 10: "Just Dance" by Lady Gaga
Top 9: "You Keep Me Hangin' On" by Kim Wilde
Top 8: "Family Portrait" by P!nk
Top 7: "The Man I Love" by Ella Fitzgerald – Eliminated on 18 October

Scott Newnham
Scott Newnham was born in 1989 and comes from Melbourne. He works as a bricklayer, and before Idol, had never sung in front of another person except his best friend.

Audition: "You Give Me Something" by James Morrison
Theatre Week (Round 1): "Elevator Love" by Guy Sebastian
Theatre Week (Round 2): "Rock with You" by Michael Jackson
Theatre Week (Round 3): "Isn't She Lovely" by Stevie Wonder
Top 24: "Run It!"  by Chris Brown
Top 12: "Come Together" by The Beatles
Top 11: "American Woman" by The Guess Who
Top 10: "Kiss from a Rose" by Seal
Top 9: "Let's Groove" by Earth, Wind & Fire
Top 8: "So What" by P!nk – Eliminated on 11 October

Tim Johnston
James Johnston was born in 1981 and comes from Newcastle, New South Wales. He auditioned for The X Factor, the fifth edition, while living in the United Kingdom. He advanced to the bootcamp round, but failed to make the cut for the Visit to the Judges' houses. He works as a barista.

Audition: "I Heard It Through the Grapevine" by Marvin Gaye
Theatre Week (Round 1): "Angels" by Robbie Williams
Theatre Week (Round 2): N/A
Theatre Week (Round 3): N/A
Top 24: "Signed, Sealed, Delivered (I'm Yours)" by Stevie Wonder
Wildcard: "Yesterday" by The Beatles
Top 12: "Halo" by Beyoncé
Top 11: "Jumpin' Jack Flash" by The Rolling Stones
Top 10: "What Goes Around.../...Comes Around" by Justin Timberlake
Top 9: "Heaven" by Bryan Adams – Eliminated on 4 October

Sabrina Batshon

Sabrina Batshon (born 26 October 1984) is an Australian-born singer, songwriter and actor from Rhodes, Sydney. She began singing and dancing at the age of two at the Johnny Young Talent School. She had roles on Australian television including Water Rats, G.P. and Home and Away. She won several talent quests including the McDonald's Performing Arts Challenge. In 2000, she sang with The Australian Girls Choir and Paulini for the Qantas campaign CD, The Spirit of Australia. She was understudy to Nikki Webster as Dorothy in a 2000/2001 stage performance of The Wizard of Oz and was cast as the 'Little Girl' in the 2001 production of The Witches of Eastwick (musical) in Melbourne.  She attended the Newtown High School of the Performing Arts and was named in November 2004 in Parliament by Andrew Refshauge as being one of Australia's best singers. During 2005 and early 2009 Batshon experienced chronic depression, agoraphobia and panic attacks, and was admitted to hospital. Producer Stephen Tate said speaking "openly and honestly" about depression was the way forward for the media and community.

Audition: "Nature Boy" by Nat King Cole
Theatre Week (Round 1): "Black Velvet" by Alannah Myles
Theatre Week (Round 2): "When I Fall in Love" by Nat King Cole
Theatre Week (Round 3): "Help" by The Beatles
Top 24: "Hush Hush" by The Pussycat Dolls
Top 12: "Earth Song" by Michael Jackson
Top 11: "Numb" by Linkin Park
Top 10: "When Love Takes Over" by David Guetta – Eliminated on 27 September

Casey Barnes

Casey Barnes was born on 3 September 1978 in Tasmania. At a young age he became blind in his right eye after an infection. He has opened for Bryan Adams and played alongside Eskimo Joe, Vanessa Amorosi and Diesel during his career.

Audition: "Fire and Rain" by James Taylor
Theatre Week (Round 1): N/A
Theatre Week (Round 2): "Tiny Dancer" by Elton John
Theatre Week (Round 3): N/A
Top 24: "Her Diamonds" by Rob Thomas
Wildcard: "Never Say Never (Don't Let Me Go)" by The Fray
Top 12: "On My Mind" by Powderfinger
Top 11: "I'm Not Over" by Carolina Liar – Eliminated on 20 September

Ashleigh Toole
Ashleigh Toole was born in 1991 and comes from the Central Coast, New South Wales. A student, she grew up performing in multiple music festivals with her family.

Audition: "Nobody Knows" by Pink
Theatre Week (Round 1): "I Wanna Be Your Everything" by Vanessa Amorosi
Theatre Week (Round 2): "Angels" by Robbie Williams
Theatre Week (Round 3): "River Deep - Mountain High" by Ike & Tina Turner
Top 24: "Hurt" by Christina Aguilera
Top 12: "Miss Independent" by Kelly Clarkson – Eliminated on 13 September

Grand Final Performances

Elimination chart

All four remaining contestants from Semi-final No. 4 were selected for the Wildcard show
Toby Moulton withdrew from the competition, keeping original eliminee James Johnston in the competition.

Notes

References

External links
 Official Australian Idol website
 Australian Idol news from the Daily Telegraph

Australian Idol
2009 Australian television seasons
2009 Australian television series endings